Clayton is an unincorporated community in Placer County, California. It lies at an elevation of 141 feet (43 m).

References

Unincorporated communities in California
Unincorporated communities in Placer County, California